Rohrbach Ro V was a seaplane manufactured by the Rohrbach Metall-Flugzeugbau company in Berlin, Germany. Only one was built, in 1927. It was delivered to Severa GmbH for comparison flights with the Dornier Do J "Superwal" and as a seaplane trainer. It was used for commercial flights in 1928 by the Deutsche Luft Hansa for the Travemünde to Oslo route.

Specifications

References

External links

 https://web.archive.org/web/20110718202538/http://www.biic.de/aviation-museum/planes/country/germany/planes/99.htm
http://www.histaviation.com/Rohrbach_Ro_V.html

1920s German airliners
Flying boats
Ro 05
High-wing aircraft
Aircraft first flown in 1927
Twin piston-engined tractor aircraft